Andrew Millward (born ) was a rugby union player for the Ospreys in the Celtic League. Millward's position of choice was as a prop. He is now Rugby General Manager for the team in the Pro14.

References

External links
Ospreys management profiles

1972 births
Living people
Ospreys (rugby union) players
Welsh rugby union players
Rugby union props